Persatuan Sepak Bola Pamekasan Madura Utama, commonly known as Persepam Madura Utama or Madura Utama, is an Indonesian professional football club based in Pamekasan, East Java. The club plays in the Liga 3.

History 
In season 2012–13 the club was promoted to Indonesia Super League after finishing 3rd place in 2011–12 season. In January 2015, they changed their name from Persepam Madura United to Persepam Madura Utama and their nickname to Sapeh Ngamok (The Mad Bull).

Honours 
 Liga Indonesia Premier Division
 Third place: 2011–12

See also 
 List of football clubs in Indonesia

References

External links 
 Profile at ligaindonesia.co.id
 Official Website
 

Football clubs in Indonesia
1970 establishments in Indonesia
Football clubs in East Java
Persepam Madura
Association football clubs established in 1970